The Space Safety Programme, formerly the Space Situational Awareness (SSA) programme, is the European Space Agency's (ESA) initiative to monitor hazards from space, determine their risk, make this data available to the appropriate authorities and where possible, mitigate the threat.

The SSA Programme was designed to support Europe's independent space access and utilization through the timely and accurate information delivery regarding the space environment, particularly hazards to both in-orbit and ground infrastructure. In 2019 it evolved into the present Space Safety Programme with an expanded focus, also including missions and activities to mitigate and prevent dangers from space. The programme is split into four main segments:
 Space weather: monitoring the Sun, the solar wind, and in Earth's magnetosphere, ionosphere and thermosphere, that can affect spaceborne and ground-based infrastructure or endanger human life or health. This data is processed by the Space Weather Service Network and made available freely via the Space Weather Portal. Upcoming missions such as Vigil will contribute to this monitoring system, allowing for timely warnings. 
 Planetary Defence: detecting natural objects, such as asteroids and comets, which can potentially impact Earth,gathering observations from telescopes around the world and plotting their path through the sky to calculate the impact risk, as well as coordinating with the international community the response to a possible impactor, through groups such as the International Asteroid Warning Network (IAWN) and the Space Mission Planning Advisory Group (SMPAG). ESA will soon launch the Hera mission, a follow-up to NASA's DART mission which performed the first kinetic impact test of Planetary Defence on 26 September 2022. Hera will rendezvous with the impacted Didymos binary asteroid system to study the crater formed, the dust plume released and more.
 Space debris: Tracking active and inactive satellites and space debris to better understand the debris environment; providing data, analysis and advice to spacecraft engineers to perform collision avoidance manoeuvres as well as developing a system of automated collision avoidance. The space debris office also works with the international community on norms and standards for the sustainable future of space. 
 Clean Space: systematically considering the entire life-cycle of space activities, from the early stages of conceptual design to the mission’s end of life – and even beyond, to removal of space debris. ESA Clean Space includes EcoDesign, embedding environmental sustainability within space mission design; Management of end-of-life, developing technologies to prevent the creation of future debris; in-orbit servicing/active debris removal, removing spacecraft from orbit and demonstrating in-orbit servicing of spacecraft. The first mission to remove a piece of space debris from orbit will be the ESA-commissioned Clearspace-1.

The Space Safety programme is being implemented as an optional ESA programme with financial participation by 14 Member States. The programme started in 2009 and its mandate was extended until 2019. The second phase of the programme received €46.5 million for the 2013–2016 period.

Space weather segment
The main objective of the space weather segment (SWE) is to detect and forecast of space weather events, avoid adverse effect on European space assets and ground-based infrastructure. To achieve that, the segment will focus on delivery of real-time space weather information, forecasts and warnings, supported by a data archive, applications and services. Assets currently available for the segment consist of multiple ground-based and spaceborne sensors monitoring the Sun, solar wind and Earth's magnetosphere, ionosphere and thermosphere. These include the PROBA2 satellite and the Kanzelhoehe Solar Observatory. The segment is jointly coordinated by the SWE Data Centre located at the ESTRACK Redu Station and the SSA Space Weather Coordination Centre (SSCC), both in Belgium.

Near-Earth object segment
The near-Earth object segment aims to deliver monitoring and warning of potential Earth impactors and tracking of newly discovered objects. The segment's current assets consist of a mixture of professional and amateur telescopes, including the OGS Telescope, that are supported by tracking databases. The plans are to create a fully integrated system supporting alerts for civil authorities, including the NEOSTEL flyeye telescope due for completion in 2020. The segment is operated by the SSA NEO Coordination Centre located at the ESA Centre for Earth Observation, Italy.

Space surveillance and tracking segment
The SST segment's primary goal is the detection, cataloguing and orbit prediction of objects orbiting the Earth. It is part of an effort to avoid collisions between orbiting satellites and debris, provide safe reentries, detect on-orbit explosions, assist missions at launch, deployment and end-of-life and overall reduce cost of space access. The segment currently relies on existing European radar and optical systems. Some of its assets are existing radio and optical telescopes, with now serving a secondary role for tracking space debris.

The radar-based SST assets are split into two categories: surveillance and tracking systems. SSA SST radar systems include:
 Surveillance
 Northern Cross transient radio telescope located at the Medicina Radio Observatory, serving as a receiver in bistatic radar system
 RAF Fylingdales's three face AN/FPS-132 Upgraded Early Warning phased array radar, serving as a monostatic system
 French Air Force bistatic radar-based space surveillance system GRAVES
 Tracking
 CAMRa 25-meter steerable parabolic dish S-band radar located at the Chilbolton Observatory
 EISCAT scatter radar capable of 3D monitoring of the atmosphere and ionosphere
 TIRA 34-meter parabolic dish with an L-band tracking radar and a Ku-band imaging radar

SSA SST optical surveillance and tracking assets include:
 Surveillance
 OLS telescope at the Observatorio Astronómico de Mallorca
 Starbrook and Starbrook north located at RAF Troodos
 Fabra-ROA telescope (TFRM) at Serra del Montsec
 ZimSMART robotic telescope
 Tracking
 Satellite laser ranging station Graz at Lustbühel Observatory
 Matera Laser Ranging Observatory (MLRO) in Italy
 OGS Telescope at the Teide Observatory
 TAROT and TAROT-South robotic telescope at the La Silla Observatory
 ZIMLAT telescope at the Zimmerwald Observatory
 ESA Flyeye Telescope at Sicily, Italy 

As part of the SSA Programme new, dedicated surveillance radar supported by optical sensors systems will be developed. The segment is coordinated by the Space Surveillance Test & Validation (SSTC) Centre located at the ESAC in Spain.

Close approaches of Near-Earth objects and near earth asteroids are reported by ESA through the space situational awareness center.

See also
 Kessler syndrome
 Space surveillance
 United States Space Surveillance Network

References

External links
 Official Website
 Space Surveillance and Tracking Centre

 
European Space Agency programmes
Radar networks
Environmental science
Near-Earth object tracking
Space debris